Jean de Heinzelin de Braucourt (6 August 1920 – 4 November 1998) was a Belgian geologist who worked mainly in Africa. He worked at the universities of Ghent and Brussels. He gained international fame in 1960 when he discovered the Ishango Bone.

"Jean de Heinzelin was a geologist.
A kind of a modern adventurer, Jean de Heinzelin was a field worker and a remarkable observer.

Africa was his main area of work, but he also took part in various expeditions in Europe, the United States and the Middle East.

From 1946 onward, he was associated with the Royal Belgian Institute for Natural Sciences. At the Universities of Ghent and Brussels, he imparted his knowledge enthusiastically to students.

A chance in his career - the Ishango Bone discovery - brought him international fame."

A consistent voice of empiricism and reason in African paleoecology, Dr. Heinzelin made many contributions to the understanding of how geology can inform about the history and prehistory of tropical landscapes. Many of his original conclusions are still valid, especially his interpretation of the humid tropical fluvial origin of sand and gravel sediments in Central Africa that are still wrongly attributed to desert processes (e.g., J. Runge 2007)..

See also
 Gaston Briart
 Paul Fourmarier
 William van Leckwijck

References
Biography at the Royal Belgian Institute of Natural Sciences Accessed January 2007

Belgian geologists
1920 births
1998 deaths
20th-century geologists
Belgian expatriates in the Democratic Republic of the Congo